Thaden is a municipality in the district of Rendsburg-Eckernförde, in Schleswig-Holstein, Germany.

Geography
Thaden is located about 25 km southeast of Heide in a rural environment. North of the community runs the Kiel Canal, about 11 km south of the federal highway 430 from Neumünster towards Meldorf and about 12 km southwest of the Federal Highway 23 from Hamburg to Heide.

References

Municipalities in Schleswig-Holstein
Rendsburg-Eckernförde